Charles A. Stainback (c. 1879 – 1961) was an American lawyer and politician. He served as a Democratic member of the Tennessee Senate. He was a segregationist.

Early life
Stainback was born circa 1879 in Somerville, Tennessee. His father, Charles A. Stainback Sr, was a lawyer and his brother, Ingram Stainback, served the ninth Territorial Governor of Hawaii.

Stainback graduated from the Vanderbilt University Law School in 1901.

Career
Stainback became a lawyer in Somerville. He joined the Democratic Party, and attended the Democratic National Convention four times.

Stainback served as a member of the Tennessee Senate. In 1955, he sponsored a bill to prevent the desegregation of public schools in Nashville in spite of Brown v. Board of Education. Officially, the bill was meant to prevent social unrest. However, Stainback admitted that was a covert way to "preserve segregation." The bill was vetoed by Democratic Governor Frank G. Clement.

Stainback served on the advisory board of the Tennessee Federation for Constitutional Government.

Death
Stainback died in 1961.

References

1961 deaths
People from Somerville, Tennessee
Vanderbilt University Law School alumni
Democratic Party Tennessee state senators
Year of birth uncertain